Bruce McTavish (born ) is a New Zealand-born Filipino boxing referee and philanthropist residing in the Philippines. He has been named World Boxing Council Referee of the Year in 2013, 2015, and 2017.

A long time resident in the Philippines since the late 1960s, McTavish was born in Auckland, New Zealand and was granted Filipino citizenship through naturalization in 2018 due to his work as a referee and philanthropist.

Education
After his amateur boxing career, McTavish attended Auckland University where he attained an economics degree.

Boxing career

Amateur boxing
McTavish was an amateur boxer. He retired with a record of 31 wins and 2 losses. He boxed as early as 9 years old until his early 20s.

Refereeing
Now settled in the Philippines, McTavish began his career in refereeing in the 1970s. He has officiated matches outside the Philippines and New Zealand such as in Australia, China, England, Japan, North Korea, Mexico, Russia (particularly in Siberia), Thailand and the United Arab Emirates. He has officiated some of the matches of Manny Pacquiao. Other notable matches he officiated was the match between Siriporn Thaweesuk and Ayaka Miyano in Klong Prem Central Prison, Bangkok, Thailand. Thaweesuk was the winner of the match which was also the first women's world title match. He is currently the vice-chairman of the World Boxing Council of Referees.

McTavish has won accolades for the Philippines due in relation to his work as referee. He was named World Boxing Council Referee of the Year in 2013, 2015, and 2017. McTavish is the only Philippine representative to have received the accolade.

Philanthropy
He was a member of the Rotary Club in the Philippines. From 1983 to 1984, McTavish served as president of the Rotary Club of Mabalacat. During his term he introduced the Polio Plus Project, the pilot program which became the basis of Rotary International efforts to eradicate polio worldwide. The club approached then First Lady Imelda Marcos which led to the formation of one of the first partnerships between a private entity and a government agency.

He is the first non-Filipino president of the Rotary Club of Mabalacat and the Rotary Club of Clark Centennial. McTavish is currently involved with the Bahay Bata Foundation, a residence center for street children in Angeles, Pampanga, as the chairman of the center's board of trustees. Bahay Bata is a project of Rotary Club of Clark Centennial.

Others
McTavish is the first non-Filipino director of the Metro Angeles Chamber of Commerce, the first non-Filipino presidents of the Hotel and Restaurant Association of Pampanga, and the St. James Cursillo. At the time he assumed the posts, McTavish has yet to be granted Filipino citizenship.

Naturalization
Born in Auckland, New Zealand, McTavish acquired his Filipino citizenship through naturalization in 2018. There were three attempts in the legislature to grant Filipino citizenship to McTavish with the first effort done in 2010. Congressman Carmelo Lazatin filed House Bill No. 1445 in 2010 which endorsed McTavish's application for citizenship by naturalization through legislation. The bill was referred to the Committee on Justice, which the body later approved after some amendments. The first effort failed when a new Congress was elected. In 2014 Congressman Yeng Guiao filed House Bill No. 2343 which re-endorsed McTavish's re-application. His works in philanthropy as well as international acclaim in relation to his career as a referee has been cited as reasons for his naturalization. The third attempt was a successful one after the Senate granted McTavish citizenship through House Bill No. 7388 which was sponsored by Senator Richard Gordon  as chair of Senate committee on Justice and Human Rights. The Senate announced its decision to grant him citizenship on October 1, 2018.

Personal life
McTavish has settled in the Philippines and became a resident on 12 February 1967. His first job in the country was in Clark, Pampanga area as a field office manager in an American automobile manufacturer before pursuing a career as a boxing referee. He is married to Carmen Tayag with whom he had two daughters who are master's degree holders.

References

Living people
Boxing referees
New Zealand male boxers
New Zealand philanthropists
Filipino philanthropists
Naturalized citizens of the Philippines
Filipino people of New Zealand descent
Year of birth missing (living people)